Maharaja Ranjit Singh College of Professional Sciences was established in 1994 by the Indo Friends Foundation Trust, Indore, a voluntary, non political, non-profit foundation registered with the Government of M.P. as a public trust. It is located on Khandwa Road, Indore near the IET DAVV campus.

Academics

Research The college is recognized in 2(f) and 12(B) by UGC. MPCST and MPBTC have funded several research projects to the Department of Life Science, Division of Plant Tissue Culture of the college.

Industrial Trainings and Industrial Visits Regular industrial visits are conducted for various companies e.g. Parle-G, Ruchi Soya, Symbiotec, Indore Biotech, Syncom Healthcare, Piramal, PDPL,  etc.

Sister Institutions
Mata Gujri Girls Public School, Indore;
Mata Gujri College of Professional Studies, Indore;
Guru Harkishan Public School, Indore;
Kids World International Pre-School;

Library
The library has more than 30,000 books, magazines, CDs, journals etc.

Hostels
College has separate girls and boys hostel on campus with facilities like mess, gym, recreation rooms, t.v. set, indoor games facility.

Universities and colleges in Indore
Science and technology in Indore